Thubana seimaensis is a moth in the family Lecithoceridae. It was described by Kyu-Tek Park in 2013. It is found in Cambodia.

The wingspan is 15.5–16 mm. The forewings are uniform pale greyish fuscous throughout, with a dark-brown basal fascia. There is a pair of stigmata presented: the smaller one at the middle and the larger blackish one at the end of the cell.

Etymology
The species name is derived from the type locality, Seima in Cambodia.

References

Moths described in 2013
Thubana
Moths of Asia